Belgium competed in the 2009 European Youth Summer Olympic Festival in Tampere, Finland.

Athletics

Men

Women

Basketball

Women

Cycling

Men

Gymnastics

Men

Individual Finals

Women

Individual Finals

Judo

Men

Women

Swimming

Men

Women

Mixed

Tennis

Men

Women

Volleyball

Men

Women

Belgium at multi-sport events
2009 European Youth Summer Olympic Festival